The 2010 World Weightlifting Championships were held at Antalya Expo Center in Antalya, Turkey. The event took place from September 17 to September 26, 2010.

Medal summary

Men

Women

Medal table 
Ranking by Big (Total result) medals 

Ranking by all medals: Big (Total result) and Small (Snatch and Clean & Jerk)

Team ranking

Men

Women

Participating nations
515 competitors from 74 nations competed.

 (10)
 (10)
 (9)
 (10)
 (1)
 (1)
 (4)
 (4)
 (13)
 (15)
 (13)
 (14)
 (1)
 (6)
 (8)
 (1)
 (5)
 (9)
 (10)
 (2)
 (1)
 (3)
 (8)
 (7)
 (11)
 (1)
 (9)
 (1)
 (1)
 (11)
 (9)
 (12)
 (7)
 (8)
 (2)
 (9)
 (15)
 (15)
 (1)
 (4)
 (3)
 (5)
 (2)
 (1)
 (4)
 (7)
 (7)
 (9)
 (1)
 (15)
 (5)
 (2)
 (11)
 (14)
 (8)
 (1)
 (7)
 (6)
 (12)
 (10)
 (3)
 (1)
 (1)
 (13)
 (5)
 (15)
 (8)
 (14)
 (3)
 (15)
 (1)
 (13)
 (10)
 (2)

References
Results

External links
Official website
IWF results 

 
W
World Weightlifting Championships
World Weightlifting Championships
World 2010
Sport in Antalya
21st century in Antalya